The , sometimes in older literature the Tenneru Conglomerate Member of the Chorobetsu Formation, is a geological formation in southeast Hokkaidō, Japan, in the area of Kushiro. Deposited between the Harutori Formation and Yūbetsu Formation in the Urahoro Group that unconformably overlies the Nemuro Group in the Nemuro Belt, the Tenneru Formation correlates with the Rushin Formation at its western end. The Formation, laid down in the Late Eocene, consists mainly of reddish and reddish brown conglomerate, with some sandstone and mudstone; there are several intercalated coal seams. New species of fauna described from the Tenneru Formation include the "Kushiro tapir" [ja] (Plesiocolopirus kushiroensis; protonym: Colodon kushiroensis), and of flora, Actinidia harutoriensis, Alnus ezoensis, Aralia ezoana, Cordia japonica, Cupania japonica, Idesia kushiroensis, Lastrea kushiroensis, and Maesa nipponica.

Flora

Family: Osmundaceae
Genus: Osmunda
Osmunda sachalinensis
Family: Polypodiaceae
Genus: Lastrea
Lastrea kushiroensis
Family: Equisetaceae
Genus: Equisetum
Equisetum arcticum
Family: TaxodiaceaeGenus: GlyptostrobusGlyptostrobus europaeusGenus: MetasequoiaMetasequoia occidentalisFamily: Aceraceae
Genus: AcerAcer arcticumFamily: Actinidiaceae
Genus: ActinidiaActinidia harutoriensisFamily: Alangiaceae
Genus: AlangiumAlangium basiobliquumAlangium basitruncatumFamily: Araliaceae
Genus: AraliaAralia ezoanaFamily: Betulaceae
Genus: AlnusAlnus ezoensisFamily: Boraginaceae
Genus: CordiaCordia japonicaFamily: Cercidiphyllaceae
Genus: CercidiphyllumCercidiphyllum eojaponicumFamily: Flacourtiaceae
Genus: IdesiaIdesia kushiroensisFamily: Myrsinaceae
Genus: MaesaMaesa nipponicaFamily: Platanaceae
Genus: PlatanusPlatanus aceroidesPlatanus guillelmaeFamily: Sapindaceae
Genus: CupaniaCupania japonicaFamily Ulmaceae
Genus: PlaneraPlanera ezoanaGenus: TremaTrema asiaticaGenus: UlmusUlmus harutoriensisGenus: ZelkovaZelkova kushiroensis''

See also
 Kushiro Coal Mine
 Kushiro City Museum

References

Geologic formations of Japan
Landforms of Hokkaido